Dalet (Burmese:ဒလက်မြို့, or Dalat is a small town in Ann Township, Kyaukpyu District, in northern Rakhine State in the westernmost part of Burma (Myanmar). It is northwest of Ann on the Ann - Minbya highway. Dalet is located on the Dalet River (Dalet Chaung).

Notes

External links
"Dalet Map — Satellite Images of Dalet" Maplandia

Populated places in Kyaukpyu District
Ann Township